Chronology of Oceania : The thematic eventsof 2010 in Oceania. 
 2008 in Oceania- 2009 in Oceania - 2010 in Oceania - 2011 in Oceania - 2012 in Oceania

Policy

Elections 
 February 27 : Nauruan constitutional referendum in Nauru. The proposed amendments (which would allow the election of the President of the Republic at the direct vote, rather than indirect) were rejected by 67% of the expressed votes.
 April 24 : Nauruan parliamentary election in Nauru. It was anticipated elections, to 'unblock' a Parliament where the presidential government and the opposition each benefited of nine deputies out of eighteen. The eighteen outgoing deputies were however renewed, keeping the country in a political doubt state.
 August 4 : Parliamentary elections in the Solomon Islands.
 August 21 : Parliamentary elections in Australia. The prime minister Julia Gillard, replacing Kevin Rudd at the head of the country following an inner sling in the Labour party, aimed to legitimate her status obtaining a mandate from the citizens, via anticipated elections. The Labours got 72 seats out of 150 at the House of Representatives, as much as the liberal opposition, but could form a government with the support of a green deputy and of three unlabeled deputies.
 Septembre 16 : Parliamentary elections in the Tuvalu.
 25 novembre : Parliamentary elections in the Tonga. The citizens were led, for the first time, to elect a majority of the deputies. Up to now, the 'People's Representatives' formed a minority at the Parliament, alongside Nobility' Representatives and members of the executive appointed by the king and sat at the Parliament.

Governments 
 Australia
 queen : Elizabeth II of Australia
 governor-general : Quentin Bryce
 prime minister : Julia Gillard
 Cook Islands
 queen : Elizabeth II of New Zealand
 queen's representative : Frederick Goodwin
 prime minister : Jim Marurai (up to the November 30), then Henry Puna
 Fiji
 Paramount chief : Elizabeth II
 president : Epeli Nailatikau
 prime minister : Frank Bainimarama
 Kiribati
 president : Anote Tong
 Marshall Islands
 president : Jurelang Zedkaia
 Federated States of Micronesia
 president : Manny Mori
 Nauru
 president : Marcus Stephen
 Niue
 queen : Elizabeth II of New Zealand
 prime minister : Toke Talagi
 New Zealand
 queen : Elizabeth II of New Zealand
 governor general : Anand Satyanand
 prime minister : John Key
 Palau
 president : Johnson Toribiong
 Papua New Guinea
 queen : Elizabeth II of Papua New Guinea
 governor general : Paulias Matane (up to the December 13), then Michael Ogio (temporarily)
 prime minister : Michael Somare (Sam Abal ensuring his functions temporarily from the December 14)
 Solomon Islands
 queen : Elizabeth II of Solomon Islands
 governor general : Frank Kabui
 prime minister : Derek Sikua (up to the August 25), then Danny Philip
 Samoa
 O le Ao O le Malo : Tupua Tamasese Tupuola Tufuga Efi
 prime minister : Tuilaepa Sailele Malielegaoi
 Tonga
 king : George Tupou V
 prime minister : Feleti Sevele (up to the December 21), then Lord Tu‘ivakano
 Tuvalu
 queen : Elizabeth II of Tuvalus
 governor general : Filoimea Telito (up to the April 16), then Iakoba Italeli
 prime minister : Apisai Ielemia (up to the September 29), then Maatia Toafa (up to the December 24), then Willy Telavi
 Vanuatu
 president : Iolu Abil
 prime minister : Edward Natapei (up to the December 2), then Sato Kilman

Environment 
 November 10 : Ambo Declaration, stemming from the 2010 United Nations Climate Change Conference, in Kiribati

Death 
 March : Bernard Narokobi, born in 1937,  Papua New Guinean politician, diplomat and philosopher.
 December 4 : Jacques Lafleur, born on the 20 novembre 1932, died on the Gold Coast (Queensland, Australia), New Caledonian politician, old deputy at the French National Assembly (1978-2004), old president of the Assembly of the South Province (1989-2004), historic leader of the anti-independence camp (1977-2004), signatory of the Matignon Agreements in 1988 and of the Nouméa Accord in 1998.

Notes and references 

 
2010s in Oceania